Miss Universe Philippines 2022 was the third edition of the Miss Universe Philippines pageant. The coronation night was held on April 30, 2022, at the SM Mall of Asia Arena in Bay City, Pasay, Metro Manila, Philippines.

The coronation night was livestreamed by ABS-CBN through iWantTFC, YouTube, and The Filipino Channel on April 30, 2022 with a delayed telecast on GMA Network on May 1, 2022. Beatrice Luigi Gomez of Cebu City crowned Silvia Celeste Cortesi of Pasay as her successor at the end of the event. Cortesi represented the Philippines at the Miss Universe 2022 pageant in New Orleans, Louisiana, United States, however, she did not advance to the Top 16.

Background

Location and date
On January 3, 2022, the organization announced that the coronation will be in April 2022. Screenings began in February 2022. On March 17, 2022, the organization confirmed that the coronation night will be on April 30, 2022 at the SM Mall of Asia Arena in Bay City, Pasay, Metro Manila, Philippines.

Selection of participants
On January 31, 2022, the organization launched its search for the next Filipina who will represent the Philippines at the Miss Universe 2022 competition. The final submission of application was initially set for February 15, 2022 but was later extended to February 22, 2022.

On February 28, 2022, the organization revealed its Top 50 delegates that will undergo a series of online challenges to fight for a slot in the final 32 delegates. The online challenges premiered on Kumu starting March 11, 2022.

Top 50
The Top 50 delegates competed in different challenges. The public and judges' votes determined the winners of every challenge.

Kumu Challenges
On March 26, 2022, Kumu announced the two winners for its Livestream and Follower challenges. The winner of the Follower Sprint challenge will get her own Kumu dressing room during the preliminary competition. On the other hand, the winner of the Livestream challenge will get her own make-up artist during the preliminary competition. The winner of the Livestream challenge also became the second official delegate of the pageant.

Top 32
On April 6, 2022, the organization revealed its final 32 delegates. Two delegates advanced to the Top 32 as Kumunity's choice and Kumu's choice while thirty delegates were chosen based from all of the online challenges which were scored by the public and the panel of experts.

New crown
On April 18, 2022, the organization announced that a new crown in collaboration with Jewelmer would be unveiled on April 19, 2022. At the Miss Universe Philippines 2022 gala night held on April 19, 2022, the organization and Jewelmer revealed the new crown named La Mer en Majesté or "The Sea in Majesty" which aptly pays homage to her majesty, the sea, for "she is the queen of the elements". Embedded in it are the Golden South Sea Pearls, the national gem of the Philippines, "a radiant symbol of the harmonious relationship between man and nature, capturing the very spirit of the Filipinos".

Results

Placements

§ – Lazada Fan Vote Winner

Major awards

Special awards

Pageant

National Costume competition
On April 20, 2022, the organization announced that the national costume competition will be filmed in Vigan, Ilocos Sur, Philippines. Originally scheduled to be livestreamed on TikTok on April 25, 2022, it was moved to April 26, 2022 due to technical concerns. The competition featured a new Johannes Rissler track entitled "Habi". For this edition's national costume competition, the organization decided that 30% of each finalist’s costume should be made of Philippine textiles or weaving.

Preliminary competition
On April 16, 2022, the organization announced that the preliminary competition would be held on April 27, 2022 at The Cove Manila in Okada Manila, Parañaque, Metro Manila, Philippines. Marco Gumabao and Beatrice Gomez hosted the event, while Ez Mil, Anji Salvacion, Yheen & Yuki, and Gabriel Umali performed as musical guests.

Final program
On March 17, 2022, the organization confirmed that the coronation night would be on April 30, 2022 at the Mall of Asia Arena in Bay City, Pasay, Metro Manila, Philippines.

On March 26, 2022, the organization announced that former Miss Universe titleholders Pia Wurtzbach, Iris Mittenaere, and Demi-Leigh Tebow would be hosting the coronation night.

On April 12, 2022, the organization announced that musician and singer-songwriter Bamboo Mañalac would be performing on the coronation night. On April 13, 2022, the organization announced that actor, dancer, and singer Sam Concepcion would also be performing on the coronation night. On April 18, 2022, the organization announced that Filipino-American singer Francisco Martin would also be performing at the coronation night. On April 19, 2022, the organization announced that singer-songwriter and performer Morissette, singer-songwriter JM Bales, and R&B singer Arthur Nery would have their special performances on the coronation night.

Selection committee
The judges for both the preliminary competition and the final telecast determined the results alongside a public vote, which consists of:
  Lia Andrea Moss –  Binibining Pilipinas Universe 2006
 Joshua Sorrentino – International model
 Margarita Gutierrez – Lawyer and vice-president of Professional Models Association of the Philippines (PMAP)
 Richelle Singson-Michael – Architect and businesswoman
 RS Francisco – Actor and co-founder of Frontrow
 Sam Verzosa – Co-founder and CEO of Frontrow
 Jennifer Olay – Pediatrician
 Tonee Co See – Chief Operating Officer of Aqua Boracay 
 Francis Padua Papica – Attorney and president of Francis Padua Papica Foundation
 Harnaaz Sandhu – Miss Universe 2021 from India

Contestants
31 contestants competed for the title.

Notes

References

External links

2022 beauty pageants
2022 in the Philippines
Beauty pageants in the Philippines
2022